Wolseley Buttress is a high buttress on the southern edge of Detroit Plateau, forming the west side of Albone Glacier on Nordenskjöld Coast in Graham Land, Antarctica. Mapped from surveys by Falkland Islands Dependencies Survey (FIDS) (1960–61). Named by United Kingdom Antarctic Place-Names Committee (UK-APC) after The Wolseley Tool and Motor Car Company which, in 1908–10, designed the experimental motor sledge used by Captain Scott's 1910-13 expedition.

References
 SCAR Composite Antarctic Gazetteer.

Rock formations of Graham Land
Nordenskjöld Coast